"Anyone of Us (Stupid Mistake)" is the second single from English pop singer Gareth Gates' debut studio album, What My Heart Wants to Say (2002). It was written by Jörgen Elofsson, Per Magnusson, and David Kreuger and produced by Magnusson and Kreuger. The single was released on 8 July 2002, entering the UK Singles Chart at  1 and staying there for three weeks, going platinum for sales exceeding 600,000 copies. It was then released in mainland Europe in 2003, reaching No. 1 on the Dutch, Norwegian, and Swedish charts. The video for the single was filmed in Venice, Italy.

Track listings

 UK CD single
 "Anyone of Us (Stupid Mistake)"
 "Forever Blue"
 "Anyone of Us (Stupid Mistake)" (video)
 "Anyone of Us (Stupid Mistake)" (behind the scenes footage)

 UK cassette single and European CD single 1
 "Anyone of Us (Stupid Mistake)" – 3:48
 "Forever Blue" – 3:55

 European CD single 2
 "Anyone of Us (Stupid Mistake)"
 "What My Heart Wants to Say"

 European enhanced CD single
 "Anyone of Us (Stupid Mistake)" – 3:48
 "Forever Blue" – 3:55
 "Unchained Melody" – 3:53
 "Unchained Melody" (CD-ROM video)

 European maxi-CD single
 "Anyone of Us (Stupid Mistake)" – 3:48
 "What My Heart Wants to Say" (single remix) – 4:12
 "Unchained Melody" – 3:53
 "Unchained Melody" (CD-ROM video)

Credits and personnel
Credits are lifted from the What My Heart Wants to Say album booklet.

Studios
 Recorded at A Side Studios (Stockholm, Sweden)
 Strings recorded at Soundtrade Studios (Solna, Sweden)
 Mixed at Mono Studios (Stockholm, Sweden)
 Mastered at The Calling Room (Stockholm, Sweden)

Personnel

 Jörgen Elofsson – writing
 Per Magnusson – writing, keyboards, production, arrangement
 David Kreuger – writing, programming, production, arrangement
 Anders von Hofsten – backing vocals
 Jeanette Olsson – backing vocals
 Esbjörn Öhrwall – guitar
 Tomas Lindberg – bass
 Gustave Lund – percussion
 Stockholm Session Strings – strings
 Ulf Janson – string arrangement, conducting
 Henrik Janson – string arrangement, conducting
 Magnus Andersson – recordings (strings)
 Bernard Löhr – mixing
 Björn Engelmann – mastering

Charts

Weekly charts

Year-end charts

Decade-end charts

Certifications

References

2002 songs
2002 singles
Gareth Gates songs
19 Recordings singles
Bertelsmann Music Group singles
Dutch Top 40 number-one singles
Number-one singles in Norway
Number-one singles in Scotland
Number-one singles in Sweden
RCA Records singles
Songs about infidelity
Songs written by David Kreuger
Songs written by Jörgen Elofsson
Songs written by Per Magnusson
Syco Music singles
UK Singles Chart number-one singles